Steve Hinebauch is an American politician. He serves as a Republican member of the Montana Senate, where he represents District 18, including Wibaux, Montana.

Political career 

In 2016, Hinebauch ran for election to represent District 18 in the Montana State Senate, which was an open seat as incumbent Matt Rosendale was not running for re-election. Hinebauch won a three-way Republican primary with 51.15% of the vote, and was unopposed in the general election. He is running for re-election in 2020.

As of June 2020, Hinebauch sits on the following committees:
 Fish and Game (Vice Chair)
 Public Health, Welfare, and Safety
 Judiciary

References

Living people
People from Wibaux County, Montana
21st-century American politicians
Republican Party Montana state senators
Year of birth missing (living people)